The 1970 All-Ireland Senior Camogie Championship Final was the 39th All-Ireland Final and the deciding match of the 1970 All-Ireland Senior Camogie Championship, an inter-county camogie tournament for the top teams in Ireland.

The final was marred by persistent fouls. Cork led by 7 points at half-time and won by 11 in end, a young Liz Garvan scoring 3-6.

References

All-Ireland Senior Camogie Championship Final
All-Ireland Senior Camogie Championship Final
All-Ireland Senior Camogie Championship Final, 1970
All-Ireland Senior Camogie Championship Finals
Cork county camogie team matches
Kilkenny county camogie team matches